The 5th European Rowing U23 Championships was the 5th edition and was held from 4 to 5 September 2021 at the Kruszwica regatta course in Kruszwica, Poland.

Results

Medal summary

Men

Women

References

European Rowing U23 Championships
Rowing competitions in Poland
European U23 Championships
International sports competitions hosted by Poland
European Rowing U23 Championships
European Rowing U23 Championships
Sport in Kuyavian-Pomeranian Voivodeship